Firearm case law in the United States is based on decisions of the Supreme Court and other federal courts. Each of these decisions deals with the Second Amendment (which is a part of the Bill of Rights), the right to keep and bear arms, the Commerce Clause, the General Welfare Clause, and/or other federal firearms laws.

United States Supreme Court cases
The Supreme Court has occasionally interpreted the Second Amendment and has also mentioned the Second Amendment when ruling on other legal matters.

Interpreting the Second Amendment

 United States v. Cruikshank,  - post Civil War era case relating to the Ku Klux Klan depriving freed slaves basic rights such as freedom of assembly and the right to bear arms. The court ruled the application of the First and Second Amendments "was not intended to limit the powers of the State governments in respect to their own citizens" and "has no other effect than to restrict the powers of the national government," respectively. In summary, it ruled the federal government could not file charges against citizens in federal court regarding violations of other citizens' constitutional rights. It was up to the states to protect the fundamental rights of its citizens when their rights were abridged by other citizens.

The Court also noted that the Second Amendment only restrained the government from regulating gun ownership, not other private citizens:

 Presser v. Illinois,  - This second post-Civil War era case related to the meaning of the Second Amendment rights relating to militias and individuals. The court ruled the Second Amendment right was a right of individuals, not militias, and was not a right to form or belong to a militia, but related to an individual right to bear arms for the good of the United States, who could serve as members of a militia upon being called up by the Government in time of collective need. In essence, it declared, although individuals have the right to keep and bear arms, a state law prohibiting common citizens from forming personal military organizations, and drilling or parading, is still constitutional because prohibiting such personal military formations and parades does not limit a personal right to keep and bear arms:

We think it clear that there are no sections under consideration, which only forbid bodies of men to associate together as military organizations, or to drill or parade with arms in cities and towns unless authorized by law, do not infringe the right of the people to keep and bear arms.

 United States v. Miller,  - The Court stated in part:

 District of Columbia v. Heller,  - The Court ruled the Second Amendment to reference an individual right, holding:

 McDonald v. City of Chicago,  - The Court ruled that the Second Amendment was incorporated against state and local governments, through the Due Process Clause of the Fourteenth Amendment.

In the decision, the Court said:

 Caetano v. Massachusetts,  (per curiam) - The Court ruled that the Second Amendment extends to all forms of bearable arms:

</ref>

Political scientist Earl Kruschke has categorized both Bliss and Buzzard as being "cases illustrating the individual view." Professor Eugene Volokh revealed, in the California Political Review, that a statement in a concurring opinion in Buzzard was the only support for a collective right view of the right to keep and bear arms in the 19th century.

Wilson v. State of Arkansas
In Wilson v. State of Arkansas (1878 Ark.), the Arkansas Supreme Court dealt with a conviction arising under an Arkansas state law which prohibited a person from carrying a pistol except upon his own premises or when on a journey, or when acting as or in aid of an officer, the same law addressed in the Buzzard decision of 1848.

At trial, Wilson was indicted and convicted of the act, and appealed to the state supreme court. The court reversed the trial court's decision citing an array of state decisions which permitted the state to regulate the manner of carrying a concealed weapon, but that the law at issue restricting such action to one's own premises, while on a journey, or when acting in aid of an officer was constitutionally invalid. The Wilson decision effectively overturned the prior holding in Buzzard. The opinion, authored by Chief Justice English, included the following assertion:

No doubt in time of peace, persons might be prohibited from wearing war arms to places of public worship, or elections, etc. But to prohibit the citizen from wearing or carrying a war arm, except upon his own premises or when on a journey traveling through the country with baggage, or when acting as or in aid of an officer, is an unwarranted restriction upon his constitutional right to keep and bear arms. If cowardly and dishonorable men sometimes shoot unarmed men with army pistols or guns, the evil must be prevented by the penitentiary and gallows, and not by a general deprivation of a constitutional privilege.

Salina v. Blaksley
In 1905, the Kansas Supreme Court, in Salina v. Blaksley, became the first court to interpret the right to keep and bear arms as being only a collective right. The Kansas high court declared: "That the provision in question applies only to the right to bear arms as a member of the state militia, or some other military organization provided for by law, is also apparent from the second amendment to the federal Constitution, which says: 'A well regulated militia, being necessary to the security of a free state, the right of the people to keep and bear arms shall not be infringed.'"

In 2010, Salina v. Blaksley was overruled by the passage of an amendment to the Kansas State Constitution. The amendment provides:

People v. Aguilar
In 2013, the Illinois Supreme Court in People v. Aguilar held that a total ban on carrying firearms outside the home violated the Second Amendment and was unconstitutional. Applying Heller, McDonald, and Moore v. Madigan (a Seventh Circuit decision), the Illinois Supreme Court overturned the conviction of Aguilar, stating that the right to self-defense was at the core of the Second Amendment.

See also
Concealed carry in the United States
Gun law in the United States
Index of gun politics articles
 Miller v. Bonta
 People v. Bray
 People v. Ireland
 Peruta v. San Diego

References

External links
 Arms and the law - A web site with review and analysis of firearm case law
 NRA list of firearm court cases
 Guncite - List of Supreme Court cases related to the Second Amendment on Guncite
 Supreme Court cases - Comprehensive list of Supreme Court cases which deal with firearms
 State Supreme Court cases - Comprehensive list of State Court cases which deal with firearms
 The Supreme Court's Thirty-five Other Gun Cases - What the Supreme Court Has Said about the Second Amendment

Firearm
Gun politics in the United States